Love Me, Kelly is the first album released by the Singaporean singer Kelly Poon. A new release of Love Me, Kelly includes a new song called December, composed by Poon. The album features 10 songs.

Track listing 
 Love Me Again
 愛, 無力
 答案 (Answer)
 計時炸彈 (Time Bomb)
 有些愛 (Got Love)
 非愛不可
 那一秒說的話
 魔力
 美麗笨女人
 關於愛情

2006 albums
Kelly Poon albums